Thabong (meaning 'place of happiness' in Southern Sotho) is the second largest township after  Botshabelo in the Free State province in South Africa. The township was established during the years of segregation of black people as well as the township of Bronville for coloured people adjacent to the city of Welkom, to accommodate workers at the world's richest gold mines.

The township forms part of Matjhabeng Local Municipality in the Lejweleputswa District Municipality, that includes Welkom. The township is filled with diversity of people due to people who came from various countries like Lesotho, Zimbabwe, Mozambique, etc. to work in mines of Goldfields. The most spoken languages in Thabong is Sesotho followed by Xhosa.

Geography

Communities
Thabong consists of 49 suburbs of which can classified as follow 
High-income suburbs
Middle-income suburbs
Low-income suburbs

The number of middle-class black South Africans or so called Black Diamonds in the township has risen dramatically with suburbs like Oppenheimer Park, Jerusalem Park, Mshongoville, Soweto and Las Vegas.

Demographics

Population distribution
Today the townships of Thabong and Bronville have a population of approximately 200,000 residents. Usually Thabong is referred to the combination of both Thabong and Bronville (former Coloured township) though Bronville is classified as an independent township of Welkom.

Economy

Mining
The majority of the people work in the richest mines of the Goldfields since the township was formed originally to accommodate people who worked in the mines.

Retail
People from both Thabong and Bronville do their shopping in Welkom, however, at the rate at which the township of Thabong is growing a new shopping mall, "Boitumelo Junction" has been opened. At 25,500 m2, it is anchored by Shoprite, Boxer and the usual others.

The most fashionable and lovely place of interest especially during December Holidays is Shopong Tsa Kgale meaning 'Old shops'  
That's where Thabong Kids figuratively or 'Black Diamonds' meet to enjoy themselves especially the ones who have moved out of Thabong to places like Johannesburg, Sandton, Randburg, Roodepoort, Pretoria, etc.

 Fun Park Shopping complex
 Shoprite centre
 Boitumelo Junction
 Numerous Petrol Stations
 ATMs
 Post Office

Other prominent places include
Black Joint Pub
Afro-vibe
The Zone
Georgies Lodge
The Side Bar
Tiamos restaurant and bar
Motsorotso Tavern
Tilo Tavern

Culture and contemporary life

Community Service Centres
Thabong Police Station
Multi-purpose Thabong Community Centre 
Public Libraries

Music
O'yaba is a musical group from Thabong.

Sport
Indoor Sport Centre - A municipal sport centre offering boxing, rugby, soccer, netball, tennis, hockey, cricket, bowling, swimming and snooker facilities. 

Stadium
Zuka Baloyi Stadium, a multi-sport facility, that is currently mostly used for soccer.

Law and Government

Government
Informal settlements are being transformed into formal settlements especially the one of Hani Park near the coloured township of Bronville and multiple Extensions have been formed from Hani park all the way to Straighting near the Bridge (Ext 15 to Ext 21)

Education

Schools and libraries
Primary schools

Iketsetseng 
Tsakani Primary
Tseolopele Primary
Dirisanang Primary
Mojaho Primary
Seabo Primary
Bofihla Primary
Daluvuyo Primary
Lehakwe
Mokgwabong
Lemotso
Dr. Mgoma
Dirisanang
Moramaphofu
Embonisweni
Thabong school
Tswelopele
Setshabelo
Hlolohelo
Lenyora
Thembekile
Bronville primary
Mantshebo

Secondary schools

Leseding Technical school
Lenakeng Comprehensive school
Lebogang secondary school
Lephola secondary school
Teto secondary school
Thotagauta secondary school
Lekgarietse secondary school
Letsete secondary school
Nanabolela secondary school
Welkom secondary school
Bronville High

Colleges and universities
Tertiary level

Tosa F.E.T  college situated near the suburb of Jerusalem Park is geared towards employment opportunities with Engineering been the main focus
Mechanical 
Electrical
Mining
Civil

Infrastructure

Health systems
Thabong hosts Bongani Regional Hospital and together with Bronville host various primary care clinics, some are open 24 hours per day.

Bongani Regional Hospital

Bongani is a state hospital which provides specialized secondary services and admits patients referred by Primary Health Care Institutions from surrounding towns and District Hospitals. Services include:

 24-hour casualty service
 Emergency care
 Level 2 adult and child care
 Maternity
 Gynaecology 
 Paediatrics
 Theatre
 Neonatal ICU and ICU
 Radiography
 Medical and Surgical ward
 Othopaedics
 Septic ward
 Burns unit
 Obstetrics and Gynaecology
 Dispensary
 Physiotherapy
 Social Worker
 Speech and Hearing therapy
 Oncology
 Ophthalmology
 Psychology (public)
 Renal unit
 Dental
 Occupational Health 
 Tsoanelo (ARV Treatment)

If a patient is transported by an ambulance, they receive immediate care. However, if a patient arrives with his own transport and is not in critical condition which includes trauma, one requests a docket by the receptionist and queues all day for a doctor at casualties. Many patients and staff are frustrated due to the lack of staff and resources. 

Therefore there are private hospitals available: 
 Welkom MediClinic 
 St Helena Hospital 
 Goldfields clinic/hospital 
 Mathjabeng hospital

Local clinic available with a good doctor: 
 Naledi Clinic (Stateway, Welkom)

Other facilities
 Academic Health Complex 
 Welkom Satellite
 Pilot project site for academic medical training registrars in conjunction with the Faculty of Medical Sciences, University of the Free State.

Notable people
Lerato Manzini - Professional footballer who plays for Bloemfontein Celtic in the Premier Soccer League
Mosa Lebusa -Professional footballerwho plays for Ajax Cape Town in the Premier Soccer League
Thandi Tshabalala - First class cricketer, specialist off spinner South Africa Twenty20 International
Khwezi Mkhafu, rugby union player
Kiddest Gola

References
 

Townships in the Free State (South African province)
Populated places in the Matjhabeng Local Municipality